Olszanka  is a village in the administrative district of Gmina Suchowola, within Sokółka County, Podlaskie Voivodeship, Poland.

The village has a population of 85.

References

Villages in Sokółka County